TCG Capital Management, LP, doing business as TCG or The Chernin Group, is an American investment advisory firm focused on private equity investments in the media, entertainment, technology, sports and consumer and digital media sectors.

History
Peter Chernin and Jesse Jacobs founded TCG as The Chernin Group in 2010 as a holding company to acquire and operate direct-to-consumer brands in media and technology.

TGC hired Mike Kerns, formerly a senior executive at Yahoo!, as president of digital in 2015.

In 2018, Chernin, Jacobs, and Kerns formed TCG, an investment advisory firm based in Los Angeles, San Francisco, and New York. TCG manages private equity investments in the media, entertainment, technology, sports and consumer sectors. Chernin, Jacobs, and Kerns are the co-founders and managing partners of the investment advisory firm.

Funding
In April 2012, the Financial Times reported that TCG had received $200 million in new funding from a group of investors led by Providence Equity Partners.

In November 2019, TCG announced "that it closed an inaugural fund with over $700 million of commitments from investors."

Investments
In August 2018, TCG sold its controlling interest in Otter Media to AT&T, reportedly for around $1 billion.

As of November 2019, TCG had "invested over $200 million in emerging businesses, with an average equity investment of $25 million-$75 million," including in the media and commerce site Food52, tabletop games company Exploding Kittens, MeatEater, Headspace, The Action Network, online wedding registry Zola, Cameo, ShopShops, and Dadi.

References

External links
 

Private equity firms of the United States
American companies established in 2018